The battle of Villmanstrand was fought during the Russo-Swedish War on 3 September 1741, when Russian forces of 10,000 men, under the command of General Peter von Lacy, assaulted Villmanstrand. Fighting began around 2 pm but the Swedes withdrew already at 5 pm. Swedish casualties amounted to 3,300 men killed and wounded with another 1,300 taken prisoner, among them General Carl Henrik Wrangel. Russia lost 2,400 men. Von Lacy did not continue his movement after the battle. Henrik Magnus Buddenbrock was executed for his perceived incompetency.

Russo-Swedish War (1741–1743)
Battles involving Sweden
Battles involving Russia
Conflicts in 1741
History of South Karelia